Kingston Public Hospital (KPH) is a public general hospital in Kingston, Jamaica. It is the oldest public hospital in Jamaica and is the main hospital in south eastern Jamaica.  The hospital is operated by the South East Regional Health Authority on behalf of the Ministry of Health, Jamaica.

History
Kingston Public Hospital was first opened on 14 December 1776. However, the institution was officially ratified on 21 December, 1776, when the Jamaica Assembly passed an Act (17 Geo. III c. 26) establishing the hospital. The hospital was originally located at the intersection of East and North Streets in Kingston, where a small hospital designated for slaves was converted into a male hospital and an old slave compound was converted into a female ward. Initially, KPH only treated patients from Jamaica’s white population, while the black slave population were treated on sugar plantations in what was then referred to as "hot houses" until emancipation in 1838, after which they began to be accepted by the hospital. Originally, KPH was designed as an almshouse as well as a hospital, and later became a mental asylum. However, the asylum was relocated to Rae Town, St Andrew in 1850, where it eventually became the Bellevue Hospital. In 1859, KPH began offering 24-hour service seven days per week. In 1936, the then Senior Medical Officer, Dr Arthur Westmorland, separated surgical from medical cases for the first time. Four new operating theatres were built in 1962, in addition to the two previously built in 1928. In 1963, the KPH paediatric ward was transferred to the premises of the former British Military Hospital to establish the Bustamante Hospital for Children. Since then, KPH has evolved into the largest multidisciplinary hospital in the Government Health Service as well as the largest trauma centre in the public hospital system.

Services

Kingston Public Hospital is a 475-bed hospital located on North Street in Kingston. It is the largest hospital of its kind in the English-speaking Caribbean. The institution offers a variety of services including: diagnostic imaging; laboratory services; physiotherapy; physical rehabilitative services; dietary services; radiotherapy; general surgery; ear nose and throat surgery; ophthalmology; anaesthesia; intensive care pain management; gastroenterology; haematology; dialysis; endocrinology; rheumatology; psychiatry; and cardiology. The hospital also has an internal care medicine department with many subspecialties. The facility’s accident and emergency unit sees 200 to 300 persons per day, treating up to 90,000 patients annually, while its out-patient unit handles approximately 2000 cases daily. Additionally, the hospital performs approximately 90,000 surgical procedures annually. The services offered by the hospital include:

 Accident & Emergency (A&E)
 Anaesthesia and intensive care
 Dermatology
 Dietary
 Ear, Nose & Throat (ENT)
 Endocrinology
 Gastroenterology
 General Medicine
 General Surgery
 Haematology
 Infectious Disease
 Intensive Care Unit
 Medical laboratory
 Nephrology
 Neurology
 Neurosurgery
 Obstetrics & Gynaecology (O&G)
 Oncology
 Ophthalmology
 Orthopaedics
 Outpatient Clinics
 Pediatric Surgery
 Pediatrics
 Pharmacy
 Physiotherapy
 Plastic and Re-Constructive Service
 Psychiatry
 Radiology
 Radiotherapy
 Renal Dialysis
 Rheumatology
 Urology

Notable people

 Rosita Butterfield, Turks and Caicos politician and midwife
 Mavis Gilmour, Jamaican medical practitioner and politician
 Syringa Marshall-Burnett, Jamaican nurse, educator and politician
 Gwendolyn Spencer, Jamaican nurse and midwife
 Sekhar Tam Tam, Indian medical doctor

References 

Buildings and structures in Kingston, Jamaica
Hospitals in Jamaica